Mamathe is a 1968 Indian Kannada-language film, directed by Y. R. Swamy and produced by S. Heerabai. The film stars Kalyan Kumar, Leelavathi, B. Vijayalakshmi and Narasimharaju. The film has a musical score by Chellapilla Satyam.

Cast
Kalyan Kumar
Leelavathi
B. Vijayalakshmi
Narasimharaju
K. S. Ashwath

References

External links
 

1968 films
1960s Kannada-language films
Films scored by Satyam (composer)
Films directed by Y. R. Swamy